James Wright (1819–1887) was a notable New Zealand potter. He was born in Fenton, Staffordshire, England in 1819.

Biography

In the 1850s, Wright developed the first commercial scale crockery kiln in New Zealand, alongside Daniel Pollen at the brickworks at Rosebank on the shores of the Whau River in Auckland.

References

1819 births
1887 deaths
New Zealand potters
English emigrants to New Zealand
People from Fenton, Staffordshire